Jacques Dumas (7 November 1908 – 21 July 1994), better known as Marijac, was a French comics writer, artist, and editor.

Biography
Jacques Dumas was born in Paris in 1908. He started his career as a comics artist in te 1930s and used the pen name Marijac. His best known character in this period was the cowboy Jim Boum, which appeared in Cœurs Vaillants. During the war, he entered the Resistance and started the popular magazine Coq Hardi, where he created the series Les trois mousquetaires du maquis. The magazine existed from 1944 until 1963. His focus then shifted to the writing of comics for well known French artists like Raymond Cazanave (Capitaine Fantôme), Raymond Poivet (Colonel X), Dut, Mathelot, Étienne Le Rallic (Poncho Libertas), Kline, Trubert, and Calvo (Coquin). In later years, he continued to work as an editor at magazines aimed at girls or younger children like Mireille, Frimousse and Nano et Nanette.

In 1979, he received the Grand Prix de la ville d'Angoulême, the highest comics award of France.

Bibliography
Published by Gordinne, year unknown:
 Le tour du monde de Césarin l'intrépide
 Jean et Jo
 Lyne et Zoum

Published by Gordinne between 1935 and 1940
 Les premières aventures de Flic et Piaff, art by Étienne Le Rallic, also published in Dutch
 Capitaine Pat'Fol
 Les grandes chasses du capitaine Barbedure
 Jules Barigoule, 2 volumes, also published in Dutch
 Les aventures du capitaine Bricket
 Sidonie en vacances
 Joe Bing l'intrépide, 3 volumes, 2 of those appeared in Dutch in 1937
 Marinette cheftaine
 Rozet cochon de lait, 2 volumes
 Mirobolant - aventures aérodynamiques

Published by Châteaudun, year unknown:
 Cathy, 2 volumes, art by Gloesner
 Dolores de Villafranca, art by Gloesner
 Laideron, 2 volumes, art by Gloesner

Published by Châteaudun between 1964 and 1983
 L'étroit mousquetaire, art by Jean Trubert
 Les petits révoltés du Bounty, art by Jean Trubert
 1983 : Les trois Mousquetaires du Maquis, 3rd volume

Published by L'Auvergnat de Paris:
 1936 : Les aventures de Baptistou petit Auvergnat

Published by ECA:
 1942 : Capitaine mystère

Published by Selpa
 1945 : Felicou chevalier des sous-bois

Published by Gautier-Langereau:
 1953 - 1954 : Coquin le petit cocker, 2 volumes, art by Calvo

Published by Albatros:
 1968 - 1969: Les trois Mousquetaires du Maquis, 2 volumes

Published by Glénat:
 1975 : Guerre à la Terre, 2 volumes, art by Auguste Liquois and Dut
 1976 - 1977: Capitaine fantôme, 2 volumes, art by Raymond Cazanave
 1977 : Le chevalier à l'églantine, art by Le Rallic
 1977 : Jim Boum, Le mustang fantome
 1977 : Colonel X, art by Raymond Poïvet
 1977 - 1979: Poncho Libertas, 3 volumes, art by Le Rallic
 1978 : Sitting Bull, 2 volumes, art by Dut
 1979 : Colonel X en extrême-orient, art by Gloesner
 1979 : Capitaine Flamberge

Published by Sodieg
 1977 : Costo chien policier

Published by Futuropolis
 1979 : Coquin le petit cocker, 2 more volumes, art by Calvo

Published by Ribedit
 1984 : Roland prince des bois, art by Kline

Awards
 1979: Grand Prix de la ville d'Angoulême

Notes

 Béra, Michel; Denni, Michel; and Mellot, Philippe (2002): "Trésors de la Bande Dessinée 2003-2004". Paris, Les éditions de l'amateur. 
 Matla, Hans: "Stripkatalogus 9: De negende dimensie". Panda, Den Haag, 1998.

External links
 Biography at Lambiek

1908 births
1994 deaths
Writers from Paris
French comics writers
French male writers
Grand Prix de la ville d'Angoulême winners
French Resistance members
20th-century French male writers